Elvia Carrillo Puerto (6 December 1878 – 15 April 1968) was a Mexican socialist politician and feminist activist. Carillo had been married at the age of 13 and widowed by 21. She founded Mexico's first feminist leagues in 1912, including the League of Rita Cetina Gutierrez in 1919. In 1923, Carillo became Mexico's first woman state deputy, and elected to the Chamber of Deputies Due to Carillo's contributions to Mexican government and history, she was officially decorated as a "Veteran of the Revolution." Carillo's tireless dedication to the revolution and women's movement earned her the nickname "The Red Nun".

Feminist leagues

1912–1922
Elvia Carrillo Puerto is credited with starting numerous feminist leagues in Mexico, the most prominent being the Rita Cetina Gutiérrez League, named after one of Yucatán's most prominent educators. The feminist leagues focused on many tasks to promote women's rights, beginning in Mérida, where the first were founded in 1912, and eventually spreading through Southeastern Mexico, into Central Mexico in later years. The organization led a campaign against prostitution, the use of drugs, alcoholism, superstition and fanaticism. In attempts to uplift women, the Liga Rita Cetina Gutierrez, founded in 1919, often gave talks on child care, economics and on hygiene for poor women. The league inspected schools and hospitals, and helped to establish a state orphanage. Through the feminist leagues which Carillo founded, family planning programs were instituted with legalized birth control, the first in the Western Hemisphere. Elvia believed large families were a barrier to a better life for the poor and distributed literature by Margaret Sanger, who would later go on to found the American Birth Control League, later known as Planned Parenthood, material Sanger could not distribute in the United States for legal reasons. The leagues also set up prenatal and postnatal care for women. She participated in the First Feminist Congress of Yucatán in 1916.

1923–1925
Carillo is noted as having devoted herself full-time to touring Southeastern Mexico with the goal of organizing Mayan women into leagues and preparing them for civic responsibility. The leagues would identify women of special aptitude and train them to fill elective posts in the city and state government. Carillo, after her brother and governor Felipe permitted women the right to vote and hold office, was elected in 1923 to the Yucatán legislature, Mexico's first female member of state legislature. Carillo won the election by an overwhelming 5,115 votes. While a member of government, Carillo promoted the issue of land reform, proposing plans that would provide campesinos with farms capable of sustaining their families. In doing so Carillo organized local chapters of women into Gualbertista Central Agrarian Communities for Females, named after her brother Gualberto, a senator and land reform activist.

In 1924 as women's rights were advancing, Felipe was assassinated. Felipe's death signaled a change in the local government, as well as in women's rights. While permitting women's rights in Yucatán, he had not been able to have those rights reflected in the constitution of Mexico; after his death those rights were revoked by the incoming leadership of Juan Ricardez Broca. With a new government in power, women were removed from positions in municipal and state government offices, women's suffrage was revoked, and social programs through women's leagues were no longer supported. Carillo moved to San Luis Potosí, the new center of the women's rights movement, following Felipe's death. In 1925, Carillo was elected to the national Chamber of Deputies as a representative of San Luis Potosí; she was however denied the seat due to suffrage and office-holding being restricted to males. While local governments had permitted such roles, they were still not recognized nationally.

References

1878 births
1967 deaths
Birth control activists
Members of the Chamber of Deputies (Mexico)
Mexican feminists
Mexican feminist writers
Mexican people of Maya descent
Mexican socialists
People of the Mexican Revolution
Politicians from Yucatán (state)
Mexican women's rights activists
Women members of the Chamber of Deputies (Mexico)
20th-century Mexican women politicians